Edward Thomas Collinson (2 November 1849 – 24 September 1920) was a New Zealand cricketer. He played sixteen first-class matches for Otago between 1868 and 1886.

Collinson was born at Derby in England in 1849. He worked as a solicitor and died at Melbourne in Australia in 1920. As well as playing, he also umpired in first-class matches.

References

External links
 

1849 births
1920 deaths
New Zealand cricketers
Otago cricketers
Cricketers from Derby